Padmakar Gopal Pandit (16 December 1934 – 1 July 2006) was an Indian cricket umpire. He stood in nine ODI games between 1983 and 1988.

See also
 List of One Day International cricket umpires

References

1934 births
2006 deaths
Indian One Day International cricket umpires
People from Amravati